Oakmere is a village and former civil parish, now in the parish of Delamere and Oakmere, in the Cheshire West and Chester district, in the county of Cheshire, England. The population of the civil parish taken at the 2011 census was 589. The civil parish was abolished in 2015 to form Delamere and Oakmere, part also went to Cuddington.

It has three pubs, The Abbey Arms, the Fishpool Inn and The Fourways. The adjoining village of Delamere has a post office, church and railway station on the Chester to Manchester line.

The area is mainly agricultural, and has a number of large sand quarries nearby, some of which are wet workings. The lake from which the village takes its name is a Site of Special Scientific Interest.

See also

Listed buildings in Oakmere

References

External links

Villages in Cheshire
Former civil parishes in Cheshire
Cheshire West and Chester